The Wurzels are an English Scrumpy and Western band from Somerset, England, best known for their number one hit "The Combine Harvester" and number three hit "I Am a Cider Drinker" in 1976. They are known for using British West Country phrases "ooh arr!" and calling young people "young 'uns" in songs such as "I Am a Cider Drinker" and "The Combine Harvester".

Name
The name of the band was dreamt up by founder Adge Cutler. It is short for mangelwurzel, a crop grown to feed livestock.

The Wurzels' particular "genre" of music was named Scrumpy and Western after the group's first EP of the same name, issued early in 1967. Scrumpy is a name given to traditionally-made rough cider in southwest England.

History

Adge Cutler and The Wurzels

The Wurzels were formed in 1966 as a backing group for, and by, singer/songwriter Adge Cutler. The first recordings were made live in the 'Royal Oak Inn', Nailsea, Somerset in December 1966. With a thick Somerset accent, Cutler played on his West Country roots, singing many folk songs with local themes such as cider making (and drinking), farming, dung-spreading, local villages and industrial work songs, often with a comic slant.

During the latter half of the 1960s, the band became popular regionally, and the release of the single "Drink Up Thy Zider" in 1966 led to national fame and it reaching number 45 in the UK Singles  Chart. The B-side, "Twice Daily" was banned by the BBC for being too raunchy.

A number of live albums were recorded at local pubs and clubs, filled with Cutler-penned favourites such as "Easton in Gordano", "The Champion Dung Spreader", and "Thee's Got'n Where Thee Cassn't Back'n, Hassn't?", together with songs written by others and some re-workings of popular folk songs of the time.

Adge Cutler died after falling asleep at the wheel of his MGB sports car which then overturned on a roundabout approaching the Severn Bridge. He was returning alone from a Wurzels show in Hereford in May 1974. He was buried in Nailsea.

The Wurzels
Cutler's death marked a turning point in the history of the Wurzels. Deprived of the main song-writing talent, the remaining Wurzels recorded The Wurzels Are Scrumptious! in 1975, an album containing many favourites from the back catalogue, including a number of previously unrecorded Cutler-written songs. In order to continue the surviving band needed its own songs, and these mostly took the formula of re-written popular pop songs of the time with the lyrics changed to include the usual Wurzel themes (cider, farming, local villages, Cheddar cheese, etc.)

In 1976, the Wurzels released a cover version of "The Combine Harvester", a re-work of the song "Brand New Key", by Melanie, which became a UK hit, topping the charts for 2 weeks. The band quickly followed its success with the release of a number of similarly themed songs such as "I Am A Cider Drinker" (a rework of Paloma Blanca which was written by and had been a hit for the George Baker Selection and also covered by Jonathan King the year before) which got to number three in the UK chart, and "Farmer Bill's Cowman" (a reworking of the Whistling Jack Smith instrumental "I Was Kaiser Bill's Batman").

The Wurzels have never stopped performing, but record releases during the 1980s and 1990s were few — and included singles such as "I Hate JR"  and "Sunny Weston-super-Mare". To help celebrate the 25th Anniversary of Eddie Stobart Ltd in 1995, the group signed to Cumbria record label Loose Records & Music, and recorded four new songs including the single "I Wanna Be An Eddie Stobart Driver" (released as a limited edition lorry-shaped disc). The interest in this record sparked off renewed interest in The Wurzels.

The late 1990s saw the continuing of this revival of the fortunes for the surviving Wurzels, gaining a cult status amongst students and a resurgence in their popularity in their native West Country. Under the new management of The Stranglers manager Sil Willcox a number of CD releases followed, largely featuring re-recordings of older works, but also Never Mind The Bullocks, Ere's The Wurzels containing cover versions of contemporary British rock songs. This album was recorded and produced by Louie Nicastro and George Allen. The album title and cover were a spoof of Never Mind the Bollocks, Here's the Sex Pistols.

The Wurzels covered British Sea Power's "Remember Me", while British Sea Power covered The Wurzels' "I Am A Cider Drinker". The band also supported BSP at their gig at the London Forum in November. In 2004, The Wurzels appeared on Never Mind The Buzzcocks in that year's Christmas special, performing Christmas songs to Bill Bailey's team. (Bailey is a Wurzels fan, and stood and saluted upon hearing  "Combine Harvester", later claiming that he had the tune on his doorbell at home). In 2005, the band released a limited edition split single with British Sea Power.

In 2007, The Wurzels and Tony Blackburn re-released "I Am A Cider Drinker", with the royalties from the song going to the BUI Prostate Cancer Care Appeal in Bristol.

The Wurzels continue to gig around the UK, including playing at the Shalbourne Festival for nearly 11 years, although they pulled out of the 2007 Glastonbury Festival, having been scheduled to play the bandstand stage where they could not use their own sound engineers, although they had played the same stage at the 2000 Glastonbury Festival. They were also one of the headliners at the 2007 Bristol Community Festival, and made a return to Glastonbury in 2008 (on a higher profile stage).

The Wurzels are also popular with supporters of Bristol City F.C. Their song "One for the Bristol City" is the official club anthem. First released in 1976, a newly recorded version of this song reached number 66 in the UK chart in September 2007. It is played at the final whistle at Ashton Gate if the home club win, and it is sung by fans along with another Wurzel song "I Am A Cider Drinker". The song has also been adopted by Bath City who, like Bristol City, play the track after home victories. In the 2010-11 season and thereafter, the songs after a victory for the home side were changed for "Drink Up Thy Cider". The style of the band (Scrumpy and Western) also gives its name to the Bristol City's mascot, Scrumpy the Robin.

In December 2009, they released a new single, available by internet download only — a first for the band, entitled "Ode To Adge" - a tribute to the band's founder, Adge Cutler.

In June 2010, the Wurzels' released another single (a cover of the Kaiser Chiefs "Ruby") and as another first in the band's history, issued in preview form, together with a promotional film, on their YouTube channel. The original backing chorus refrain of aah aah aah was replaced by ooarr ooarr ooarr.  The single was made available for general release only as an internet download (traditional hardcopies were made available as promo discs to radio stations). The same month the band released the album, A Load More Bullocks - timed to coincide with their appearance the previous Saturday at the Glastonbury Festival. Their session took place on the Avalon stage.

In 2011, BBC Four started a series of repeats of the popular long-running programme Top of The Pops, starting with 1976 and a programme dedicated to that year. Two of the Wurzels, Budd and Banner were interviewed as part of that programme with their first performance on the programme (1976) being screened. In the same month, the BBC's The One Show included an item on the story of the "Combine Harvester" song, featuring further interviews with Budd and Banner and extracts from the 1976 promotional film.

In 2014, they released a new song "The Mendip Windfarm Song" inspired by a local protest about wind turbines being constructed near the Wurzel HQ in Laverton.

In 2015, the Wurzels teamed up with the Farm Safety Foundation with a rewrite of "Combine Harvester", focussing on Farm Safety. The song was accompanied by a light-hearted video produced by students from Moreton Morrell College, drawing attention to the various dangers on the farm.

In February 2016, the band performed at Camden Market in London. The day after, the BBC released never before seen footage of the band from 1967, with Adge Cutler larking around in Bristol City Centre.

Prior to the COVID-19 lockdown in 2020, the Wurzels had played shows two to three times a week for nearly 50 years.

The band were the subject of a Burst Radio celebration, 'The Wurzels: From A to Z', in November 2021.

Current members
Tommy Banner is the longest serving Wurzel, having joined the band in November 1967. He is usually seen playing accordion, but has also played piano in the Wurzels' past. Hailing from Penicuik, his Scottish accent remains.

Pete Budd is the familiar front-man of the post-Cutler band.  Budd originally joined the Wurzels as a banjo player in 1972, and his distinctive West Country vocals made him an obvious replacement lead singer after Cutler's death. He continues to sing, and play banjo and guitar for the band, including in his repertoire a Mark Knopfler-esque guitar lead on their modern version of "I Wish I Was Back on the Farm", originally made famous by George Formby.

Sedge Moore (Russ Crook), born and bred in Somerset, is the bass player.

Louie 'Gribble' Nicastro is also the producer of the band's recent releases and plays keyboards, or the 'Wurzelitzer' as the stage piano is more commonly known.

Dan 'Dribble' Lashbrook joined in July 2017. He is the band’s latest and youngest member and is the Wurzels' additional keyboard player. He lives in Somerset.

Wurzel history was made at Twickenham Stadium on 6 April 2019, when all six current band members appeared together for the first time and performed "I am a Cider Drinker" as part of The Clash rugby celebrations.

Past members
Over the years many Wurzels have come and gone since Cutler first formed the group.

The original Wurzels line-up to accompany Cutler recorded their first album (Adge Cutler and the Wurzels) in 1966 and consisted of Brian Walker, Reg Quantrill, John Macey and Reg Chant. Brian Walker left in 1967, soon after the band's first album was released. Their next offering Adge Cutler and the Wurzels' Family Album, was recorded with the remaining members  – Reg Quantrill, John Macey and Reg Chant. 1967 saw a year of several changes  – Reg Chant left the group, soon followed by John Macey. Their places were filled by Henry Davies and Tommy Banner. In this year the band also toured with accordionists Ken Scott and Pete Shuttler.

The group's third album, Cutler of the West, was released in 1968 with a line-up featuring Cutler, Davies, Banner and Quantrill. Shortly afterwards they were joined by Melt Kingston for a short period, whilst Henry Davies went to work on other projects. Kingston left when Davies returned at the end of the year. Early in 1969, Davies left the group permanently and was replaced by Tony Baylis, in time for the band's fourth album release Carry On Cutler, the line-up now being Cutler, Banner, Baylis and Quantrill.

By 1974, Quantrill had been replaced by Pete Budd (born Peter Budd, 18 July 1940, Brislington, Bristol), but following the death of Cutler the Wurzels were left to continue on their own  – the future chart topping trio consisting of Banner, Budd and Baylis. The Wurzels obtained their first permanent drummer, John Morgan (born 21 April 1941, Lydney, Forest of Dean – died 17 December 2021, Gloucestershire Royal Hospital), in 1981 and the line-up then remained unchanged until Baylis left in 1983, as he was emigrating to New Zealand to become a chiropodist. Just before he left, Jai Howe played with the group for a short period, with Terry Pascoe also augmenting the line-up.

Early in 1984, Howe and Pascoe left the band and were replaced by Mike Gwilliam. For the next nine years The Wurzels consisted of Budd, Banner, Morgan and Gwilliam. In 1995, Gwilliam left and was replaced by Dave Wintour. This remained the shape of the band until 2002, when Wintour was replaced by Howe (who had played with the band in the early 1980s).

A temporary change in line-up occurred in November 2005, when long-term Wurzel Tommy Banner had to step away from performing whilst undergoing treatment for prostate cancer. His place was taken on by the band's production and sound engineer, Louie Nicastro, until Banner's health was restored and he was able to return in 2006. The death of Howe in 2007 left the band one man down  — this led to Sedge Moore being recruited to give the line-up of Budd, Banner, Morgan and Moore.

John Morgan, also known as 'Amos', was the oldest drummer in the land according to fellow band members, hailing from the Forest of Dean  — preferring hot cocoa to cider and during 'live' gigs a claim was made that he was 85 years old: This is a long standing joke made during gigs. John was actually born in 1941 in Lydney, Glos. He died on 17 December 2021 in Gloucestershire Royal Hospital of COVID-19, aged 80, leaving only Budd, Banner and Moore as the surviving members. In tribute, Banner said: "We can't believe we shan't ever see you behind those drums again."

Singles discography

Adge Cutler & The Wurzels  — UK Singles

 Denotes UK Chart Positions

The Wurzels — UK Singles

All released on 7" vinyl unless otherwise stated

 Denotes UK Chart Positions

Albums discography

Adge Cutler & The Wurzels — UK Albums

The Wurzels — UK Albums

See also
British popular music

References

External links

 

Musical groups established in 1966
English folk musical groups
British comedy musical groups
Musical groups from Somerset
Scrumpy and Western
1966 establishments in England
Musical_groups_from_Bristol